The car collection of the 29th Sultan of Brunei is the largest private car collection in the world, consisting of approximately 7,000 cars, which have an estimated combined value over US$5 billion. Within his collection of cars, the Sultan’s collection of Ferrari F40s, McLaren F1s, and Rolls-Royce vehicles are particularly notable due to the rarity of the vehicles and their value.

Ferrari F40 collection 
The Ferrari F40 was a mid-engine sports car produced from 1987 to 1992 to celebrate Ferrari’s 40th anniversary of the company’s founding in 1947. Of the eleven known Ferrari F40s purchased by the Sultan of Brunei, ten underwent cosmetic and performance modifications performed by Italian car designer firm Pininfarina, with nine of the cars being modified under the supervision of Paolo Garella, the Pininfarina Prototype Manager of the 1990s.

Modified by Pininfarina 
Under the supervision of Paolo Garella, nine Ferrari F40s were modified by Pininfarina. This included seven road cars, and two Ferrari F40 LMs. Of the seven custom road-car F40s. These seven cars were also fitted with air-conditioning, a radio, electric windows, and a tiltable steering wheel column as options requested by the Sultan.

The Sultan of Brunei also purchased two of the nineteen Michelotto F40 LMs produced by Ferrari.

Brunei F40s in public circulation 
Only three of the eleven Ferrari F40s have exchanged ownership from the Sultan of Brunei. One of these cars was the original F40 LM purchased for Brunei in 1992 which has since gone through four separate owners before ultimately being purchased by Shinji Takei in 1996. The two other vehicles were the right hand drive converted yellow F40, and right hand drive converted matte grey F40, which were both purchased back from the Brunei Royal Family by John Collins, a Ferrari dealer who worked for Talacrest, a UK-based Ferrari specialist.

The matte grey exterior car was converted to a Rosso corsa exterior with LM seats in the early 2000s. However, in 2018 the car was restored back to a matte grey exterior with red stripe, leaving the LM seats, with the work being done by UK engineering firm DK Engineering.

The yellow car was also restored to its original configuration with a Rosso Corsa exterior and red cloth interior whilst remaining in a right hand drive configuration. It is the only right hand drive Ferrari F40 up for purchase in the world.

These two F40s are the only known right hand drive F40s currently in public circulation.

McLaren F1 collection 
The McLaren F1 was a mid-engine sports car manufactured from 1992 to 1998, with a total of 106 cars being produced. Due to the extremely limited number of production, the cars are extremely rare and are valued between US$8 million to $13.5 Million. The Sultan of Brunei purchased ten of the 106 McLaren F1s produced, and these included five road cars, three F1 LMs, one F1 GT, and one F1 GTR.

Bugatti EB 110 collection 
The Bugatti EB 110 was a rear mid-engine sports car manufactured from 1991-1995. The Royal family ordered a "few" EB 110s for the collection, including 4 EB 110 SS models with the respective production codes of 01, 02, 03, 13. SS01 was sold to the UK in the early 2000's. SS02, SS03 and SS13 are still in the Royal family garages as of 2010.

Rolls-Royce collection 

As of 2011, the Sultan of Brunei holds the Guinness World Record for the largest private Rolls-Royce collection, with more than 500 Rolls-Royce vehicles.

Phantom VI 
The Rolls-Royce Phantom VI was produced from 1968 to 1990, and was commonly used by the British Monarchy. The Sultan of Brunei custom ordered four Phantom VIs, named the Rolls-Royce Cloudesque. The car was a modernised version of the Rolls-Royce Silver Cloud, produced from 1955 to 1966, having undergone engine modifications and transmission upgrades.

Silver Spur II 
The Rolls-Royce Silver Spur II was a luxury limousine produced by Rolls-Royce from 1989 to 1993. The Sultan of Brunei also custom ordered a Rolls-Royce Silver Spur II stretch limousine for his wedding day, but had the car customised such that the whole vehicle was plated with 24-carat gold, with the limousine having an estimated price of US$14 million.

Other vehicles 
BMW Nazca M12 Concept.
Ferrari F90, a limited run production car made in conjunction with Ferrari and Pininfarina in 1988.
Ferrari FX, a mid-engined sports car that was commissioned by the Sultan of Brunei and produced by Ferrari in 1995 and 1996.
Bentley Dominator, a luxury SUV produced specifically for the Sultan of Brunei in 1996. Six Bentley Dominators were constructed for the Sultan with an approximated cost of US$4.6 million per vehicle.

Gallery

References 

Brunei-related lists
Private collections in Asia
Lists of cars
Monarchy in Brunei